Flash Gordon is a video game based on a comic strip character of the same name. The game was published in 1986 by Mastertronic for the Amstrad CPC, Commodore 64, ZX Spectrum, and MSX personal computers.

It features three individual levels.  The first is set on the jungle world of Arboria in which Flash Gordon has to traverse through the jungle like maze to escape.  The second level is a beat'em up style game in which Flash fights Prince Barin.  The final level is a 3D style shooter which has Flash flying a rocket cycle in pursuit of Ming the Merciless.

Reception
Zzap!64 praised the Commodore 64 version of the game.  Reviewers appreciated the gameplay variety offered by the three different sections of the game, and the quality of graphics and sound.  It was rated 89% overall.

References

External links

1986 video games
Amstrad CPC games
Commodore 64 games
ZX Spectrum games
MSX games
Mastertronic games
Flash Gordon
Video games based on comics
Video games scored by Rob Hubbard
Video games developed in the United Kingdom